Gen. William Montgomery House is a historic home located at Danville in Montour County, Pennsylvania. It is a -story stone house with a pedimented gable roof.  The main house is three bays by two bays.  Attached to the stone structure is a gable-roofed, -story log and frame structure, thought to have been the original Montgomery House and constructed about 1777.  It was the home of the developer of Danville, Gen. William Montgomery (1736–1816).

It was listed on the National Register of Historic Places in 1979.

Montgomery House is now owned by the Montour County Historical Society and is open for seasonal tours on Sunday afternoons.

See also 
 National Register of Historic Places listings in Montour County, Pennsylvania

References

External links
 Montour County Historical Society

Houses on the National Register of Historic Places in Pennsylvania
Houses completed in 1777
Houses in Montour County, Pennsylvania
Museums in Montour County, Pennsylvania
Historic house museums in Pennsylvania
National Register of Historic Places in Montour County, Pennsylvania
Individually listed contributing properties to historic districts on the National Register in Pennsylvania